Loch Assynt is a freshwater loch in Sutherland, Scotland,  east-north east of Lochinver.

Situated in a spectacular setting between the heights of Canisp, Quinag and Beinn Uidhe, it receives the outflow from Lochs Awe, Maol a' Choire, and Leitir Easaich. It discharges into the sea at Loch Inver, via the river Inver. The general trend of the loch is west-northwest and east-southeast, while the western end bends sharply at Loch Assynt lodge to the southwest.

There is excellent fishing for trout, sea-trout, and salmon. Ardvreck Castle, once held by the MacLeods and Mackenzies, occupies a promontory on the north shore, west of Inchnadamph.

The Mermaid of Assynt 

Whispered amongst the locals of Inchnadamph, the area surrounding the castle, legend tells of MacLeod's lost daughter, Eimhir, and her continued presence at Loch Assynt. Instead of jumping to her death, they believe Eimhir plunged into the caverns of the loch and, hiding from the devil to whom she was promised, made a new home beneath the water's surface, becoming the elusive 'mermaid of Assynt'.

The locals also use this legend to account for natural changes in the landscape. When the loch's water rise above their normal levels, legend tells that these are Eimhir's tears mourning her life lost on the land. Some even claim to have sighted her weeping on the rocks, her body now transformed into half woman, half sea creature. Some contest her form, instead calling her Selkie, the Nordic mythological figure of the sea, who must first shed tears into the water in order to become visible again to the human eye.

The legend also accounts for the geology of Inchnadamph. Clootie, infuriated by the broken promise of marriage summoned meteoric rocks from Chaos to obliterate Inchnadamph and MacLeod's kingdom. It is thought that this legend bears some relationship with the scientific findings that indicate north west Scotland was struck by an object from space around 1.2 billion years ago. Geologists from Aberdeen university described the event; "[a] massive impact would have melted rocks and thrown up an enormous cloud of vapour that scattered material over a large part of the region around Ullapool. The crater was rapidly buried by sandstone which helped to preserve the evidence."

These legends are invoked to offer some mythical explanation for the unique geological and topographical character of Inchnadamph. Another version of the tale of the mermaid of Assynt relates to the creation of the Moine Thrust belt. Some believe Clootie's rage produced a tectonic rumbling from the earths core, resulting in the thrust westwards of the European plate, which is understood by geologists to account for the Moine Thrust belt.

Notes

References

 Murray, Sir John and Pullar, Laurence (1910) Bathymetrical Survey of the Fresh-Water Lochs of Scotland, 1897-1909. London; Challenger Office.

Freshwater lochs of Scotland
Inver catchment
Lochs of Sutherland